Bruno Tristan Peyron (born 10 November 1955) is a French yachtsman who, along with his crew on the catamaran Orange II, broke the outright round-the-world sailing record in March 2005.  He was the first winner of the Jules Verne Trophy in 1994, for completing a round-the-world trip in less than 80 days.  Peyron was born in Angers, France and grew up in the French Atlantic coast city of La Baule.  He has been one of the main organisers behind the round-the-world-race, The Race.

See also
 Circumnavigation
 List of circumnavigations

References

French male sailors (sport)
Single-handed sailors
1955 births
Living people